The 1964 Georgia Bulldogs football team represented the Georgia Bulldogs of the University of Georgia during the 1964 NCAA University Division football season.

Schedule

Roster

Not listed (missing number/class/position): Bob Etter, Frank Richter, Barry Wilson

References

Georgia
Georgia Bulldogs football seasons
Sun Bowl champion seasons
Georgia Bulldogs football